Metiendo Mano! It is the debut studio album between the duo by Puerto Rican-American trombonist and singer Willie Colón and Panamian singer-songwriter Rubén Blades. released on October 7, 1977 through Fania Records. It was produced by Colón and Jerry Masucci. Metiendo Mano! is the second of four collaborative duo albums by Willie Colón and Rubén Blades The production includes the song Pablo Pueblo, a piece that is part of the beginnings of "conscious" or "intellectual" salsa..

Track listing

Personnel
Producer:
 Willie Colón

Executive Producer:
 Jerry Masucci

Musicians:

 Willie Colón – Trombone Solo (“Lluvia De Tu Cielo”), Gong, Percussion
 Ruben Blades – Acoustic Guitar
 Leopoldo Pineda – Trombone Solo (“Fue Varón”)
 Papo Vasquez - Trombone
 Lewis Kahn - Trombone
 Salvador Cuevas - Bass
 Milton Cardona – Conga, Clave, Talking Drum, Quinto (“Pueblo”)
 José Mangual Jr. – Bongos, Maracas, Percussion
 Nicky Marrero – Timbales
 José Torres – Piano
 Sonny Bravo – Piano (“Pablo Pueblo”), (“Según El Color”)
 Tom Malone – Tuba, Harp Synthesizer
 Yomo Toro – Cuatro (“Según El Color”), Lead Acoustic Guitar (“Me Recordarás”)
 Ruben Blades – Lead Vocals
 Chorus – Willie Colón, Ruben Blades, Milton Cardona, José Mangual Jr

Arrangements:

 Willie Colón (“Según El Color”, “La Mora”, “Plantación Adentro”)
 Louie Cruz  (“Pueblo”, “Lluvia De Tu Cielo”)
 Louis Ortíz – (“Pablo Pueblo”, “La Maleta”)
Louie Ramírez (“ Fue Varón”)

Recorded at – La Tierra Sound Studios, NY

Engineers:

 Jon Fausty
 Irv Greenbaum

Photography – Mark Kozlowiski

Design – Izzy Sanabria

Title Design – Pam Lessero

References

1977 albums
Fania Records albums
Willie Colón albums
Rubén Blades albums